The Decker House Hotel is a historic building located in Maquoketa, Iowa, United States.  James Decker, an entrepreneur from Watertown, New York held numerous real estate holdings in and around Maquoketa. He built the first Decker House, a frame structure, in 1856.  After Maquoketa was named the county seat in 1873, Decker decided to replace it.  The three-story, brick, Italianate building was designed by Watertown architect W.W. Tucker.  Its decoration is limited to the north and east elevations.  Noteworthy, is its metal cornice and window hoods.  It opened in May 1878, and it had two other competitors in town at that time.  Following his death in 1881, James Decker's son Leonard took over his holdings in New York and Iowa.  He moved into the Decker House in 1885 and died there in 1900.  The building has subsequently lost its entrance porch, original front doors and the pediment over the cornice.  It was listed on the National Register of Historic Places in 1978.

References

Hotel buildings completed in 1878
Buildings and structures in Maquoketa, Iowa
National Register of Historic Places in Jackson County, Iowa
Hotel buildings on the National Register of Historic Places in Iowa
Italianate architecture in Iowa